A Funeral for Lightning is a Canadian short drama film, directed by Emily Kai Bock and released in 2016. The film stars Annie Williams as Mandy, a pregnant woman who is becoming disillusioned with her husband Cornelius's (Daniel Frazier) insistence on living off the grid in rural Tennessee.

The film premiered at the 2016 Toronto International Film Festival.

The film was named to TIFF's year-end Canada's Top Ten list for 2016. At the 5th Canadian Screen Awards in 2017, it was a shortlisted nominee for Best Live Action Short Drama.

The name of the work is borrowed from a song title by Doldrums, a Canadian music project which she directed a music video for.

References

External links
 

2016 films
2010s English-language films
Canadian drama short films
2010s Canadian films